Ranqueles is a genus of beetles in the family Cerambycidae. The genus was circumscribed by French entomologist Pierre-Émile Gounelle in 1906, with the South American R. mus assigned as the type, and at that time, only species. It now contains the following species:

 Ranqueles gounellei Bosq, 1947
 Ranqueles mus Gounelle, 1906
 Ranqueles steparius Di Iorio, 1996

References

Bothriospilini
Cerambycidae genera
Beetles of South America
Taxa described in 1906